The Loreto Convent is a convent and school in Gibraltar. It is run by the Loreto Nuns.

References

Schools in Gibraltar